Richard D. DiMarchi (born December 5, 1952) is the current chairman in biomolecular sciences and professor of chemistry at Indiana University. He is most notable for his work as a former vice president at Eli Lilly and Company.

He received his bachelor's degree from Florida Atlantic University in 1974, and his doctorate from Indiana University in 1979.

DiMarchi recently developed a synthetic analog of the human version of the hormone glucagon. DiMarchi's glucagon analog possesses similar biological properties to natural glucagon. It dissolves easily and maintains its structural integrity over extended periods at room temperature.

He is the Linda & Jack Gill Chair in Biomolecular Sciences and Professor of Chemistry at Indiana University.

References

External links
Richard D. DiMarchi at Indiana University – Bloomington

Businesspeople in the pharmaceutical industry
Eli Lilly and Company people
Florida Atlantic University alumni
Indiana University alumni
Indiana University faculty
Living people
1952 births